Onkar may refer to:

Om, the sacred Hindu syllable or mantra
Ik Onkar, the sacred Sikh symbol